Lepidoptera of Bahrain consist of both the butterflies and moths recorded from Bahrain.

According to a recent estimate, there are a total of 93 Lepidoptera species present in Bahrain, excluding microlepidoptera.

Butterflies

Hesperiidae
Pelopidas thrax (Hübner, 1821)

Lycaenidae
Brephidium exilis (Boisduval, 1852)
Chilades parrhasius (Fabricius, 1793)
Freyeria trochylus (Freyer, 1845)
Lampides boeticus (Linnaeus, 1767)
Luthrodes galba (Lederer, 1855)
Tarucus rosacea Austaut, 1885
Zizeeria knysna (Trimen, 1862)

Nymphalidae
Danaus chrysippus (Linnaeus, 1758)
Junonia orithya (Linnaeus, 1758)
Vanessa cardui (Linnaeus, 1758)

Papilionidae
Papilio demoleus Linnaeus, 1758

Pieridae
Catopsilia florella (Fabricius, 1775)
Colias croceus (Geoffroy, 1785)
Colotis fausta (Olivier, 1804)

Moths

Arctiidae
Utetheisa pulchella (Linnaeus, 1758)

Autostichidae
Heringita amselina (Gozmány, 1967)
Turatia psameticella (Rebel, 1914)

Cossidae
Eremocossus vaulogeri (Staudinger, 1897)
Holcocerus gloriosus (Erschoff, 1874)
Wiltshirocossus aries cheesmani (Tams, 1925)

Crambidae
Amselia heringi (Amsel, 1935)
Ancylolomia micropalpella Amsel, 1951
Nomophila noctuella ([Denis & Schiffermüller], 1775)
Pediasia numidellus (Rebel, 1903)
Prionapteryx soudanensis (Hampson, 1919)

Ethmiidae
Ethmia quadrinotella (Mann, 1861)

Geometridae
Casilda antophilaria (Hübner, 1813)
Eupithecia tenellata Dietze, 1908
Idaea granulosa (Warren & Rothschild, 1905)
Idaea illustris (Brandt, 1941)
Idaea mimetes (Brandt, 1941)
Jordanisca tenuisaria Staudinger, 1900
Microloxia herbaria (Hübner, 1813)
Neromia pulvereisparsa (Hampson, 1896)
Phaiogramma discessa (Walker, 1861)
Pingasa lahayei (Oberthür, 1887)
Pseudosterrha rufistrigata (Hampson, 1896)
Rhodometra sacraria Linnaeus, 1767
Scopula adelpharia (Püngeler, 1894)
Scopula minorata ochroleucaria (Herrich-Schäffer, 1851)
Semiothisa syriacaria Staudinger, 1871
Tephrina perviaria Lederer, 1855
Traminda mundissima (Walker, 1861)
Zygophyxia relictata (Walker, 1866)

Lasiocampidae
Streblote siva (Lefèbvre, 1827)

Lymantriidae
Euproctis cervina (Moore, 1877)

Noctuidae
Acantholipes circumdata Walker, 1858
Agrotis herzogi Rebel, 1911
Agrotis ipsilon (Hufnagel, 1766)
Agrotis lasserrei (Oberthür, 1881)
Agrotis margelanoides (Boursin, 1944)
Agrotis sardzeana Brandt, 1941
Agrotis spinifera Hübner, 1808
Anumeta spilota Ershov, 1874
Anumeta straminea (Bang-Haas, 1906)
Aucha polyphaenoides (Wiltshire, 1961)
Caradrina ingrata Staudinger, 1897
Cardepia sociabilis (Graslin, 1850)
Catamecia minima (Swinhoe, 1889)
Cerocala sana Staudinger, 1901
Cleonymia chabordis (Oberthür, 1876)
Clytie infrequens (Swinhoe, 1884)
Condica illecta (Walker, 1865)
Condica viscosa (Freyer, 1831)
Drasteria yerburyi (Butler, 1892)
Dysgonia torrida (Guenée, 1852)
Earias insulana (Boisduval, 1833)
Eublemma bistellata Wiltshire, 1961
Eublemma bulla Swinhoe, 1884
Eublemma cochylioides (Guenée, 1852)
Eublemma gayneri (Rothschild, 1901)
Eublemma pallidula Herrich-Schäffer, 1856
Eublemma parva (Hübner, 1808)
Eublemma rushi Wiltshire, 1961
Eublemma siticuosa (Lederer, 1858)
Eublemma straminea Staudinger, 1891
Garella nilotica (Rogenhofer, 1881)
Gnamptonyx innexa (Walker, 1858)
Heliothis albida (Hampson, 1905)
Heliothis nubigera (Herrich-Schäffer, 1851)
Heliothis peltigera (Denis & Schiffermüller, 1775)
Heteropalpia acrosticta (Püngeler, 1904)
Heteropalpia profesta (Christoph, 1887)
Heteropalpia vetusta (Walker, 1865)
Hypena abyssinialis Guenée, 1854
Metopoceras kneuckeri (Rebel, 1903)
Mocis frugalis (Fabricius, 1775)
Mythimna brandti Boursin, 1963
Pandesma anysa Guenée, 1852
Rhynchodontodes revolutalis Zeller, 1852
Rivula sericealis (Scopoli, 1763)
Scythocentropus inquinata (Mabille, 1888)
Spodoptera cilium Guenée, 1852
Spodoptera exigua (Hübner, 1808)
Spodoptera litura (Fabricius, 1775)
Spodoptera mauritia (Boisduval, 1833)
Thiacidas postica Walker, 1855
Thysanoplusia daubei Boisduval, 1840
Trichoplusia ni (Hübner, 1800-1803)
Zekelita ravalis (Herrich-Schäffer, 1851)

Nolidae
Nola harouni (Wiltshire, 1951)

Pterophoridae
Agdistis adenensis Amsel, 1961
Agdistis arabica Amsel, 1958
Agdistis hakimah Arenberger, 1985
Agdistis nanodes Meyrick, 1906
Agdistis olei Arenberger, 1976
Agdistis tamaricis (Zeller, 1847)
Agdistis tenera Arenberger, 1976
Pterophorus ischnodactyla (Treitschke, 1833)

Pyralidae
Ancylosis aspilatella (Ragonot, 1887)
Ancylosis costistrigella (Ragonot, 1890)
Ancylosis faustinella (Zeller, 1867)

Sphingidae
Agrius convolvuli (Linnaeus, 1758)
Daphnis nerii (Linnaeus, 1758)
Macroglossum stellatarum (Linnaeus, 1758)
Hyles lineata (Fabricius, 1775)

Tortricidae
Trachysmia jerichoana (Amsel, 1935)

References

External links
Bahraini moths at AfroMoths

Lists of butterflies by location
Lists of moths by country
lepidoptera
Lepidoptera by country

lepidoptera